Anarchy is the fourth studio album by American rapper Busta Rhymes, released on June 20, 2000 by Flipmode Records and Elektra Records. It comes after the release of The Coming, When Disaster Strikes and Extinction Level Event (Final World Front). Unlike these albums, Anarchy does not follow the apocalypse theme. The album debuted at number 4 on the Billboard 200 with first-week sales of 164,000 copies. The album would later be certified Platinum by the RIAA. This was Busta's final album with Elektra Records.

Track listing 
Credits adapted from the album's liner notes.

Sample credits
"Salute Da Gods!!" contains a sample from "Betcha by Golly Wow!", written by Thom Bell and Linda Creed, performed by Ferrante & Teicher
"Enjoy Da Ride" contains a sample from "Dream Suite" by Dreams.
"Fire" embodies portions of "Surrender", written by Nickolas Ashford and Valerie Simpson.
"Show Me What You Got" contains a sample from "Come and Play in the Milky Night", written by Lætitia Sadier and Tim Gane, performed by Stereolab.
"Get Out!!" contains a sample from "The Ugly Duckling", written by Frank Loesser, performed by The Richard Wolfe Children's Chorus.
"A Trip Out Of Town" contains a sample from "Those Were the Days" written by Eugene Raskin.
"Ready For War" contains a sample from "Can’t It Wait Until Tomorrow" performed by Diana Ross.

Charts

Weekly charts

Year-end charts

Certifications

References 

Busta Rhymes albums
2000 albums
Albums recorded at Metalworks Studios
Albums produced by Scott Storch
Albums produced by Swizz Beatz
Albums produced by Just Blaze
Albums produced by J Dilla
Albums produced by Large Professor
Albums produced by DJ Scratch
Albums produced by Nottz
Albums produced by Rockwilder
Elektra Records albums